Karen Pearce (born 19 September 1968) is an Australian professional golfer who has played on the WPGA Tour of Australasia, Ladies European Tour, and the LPGA Tour.

Career 
Pearce had success as an amateur golfer and won the 1984 Queensland Foursomes Championship with Faye Payne. In 1988, she won the New South Wales Women's Amateur Championship, beating Tracie Hale 5 and 3 in the final.

Pearce turned professional in 1990 and later joined the Ladies European Tour. In 1998, she finished 4th at the McDonald's WPGA Championship at Gleneagles, and 8th at the Evian Masters. In 2000, she finished tied 3rd at the Waterford Crystal Ladies' Irish Open, six strokes behind winner Sophie Gustafson of Sweden. In 2002, she finished solo 6th at the Women's Australian Open.

Pearce played on the LPGA Tour between 1999 and 2004, where she made the cut at two different majors, the du Maurier Classic and the Women's PGA Championship. In 2000, she finished 12th at the Australian Ladies Masters, and in 2003 finished 14th at the State Farm Rail Classic. She also secured two titles on the LPGA Futures Tour, in 1997 and 2000. Over her LPGA Tour career, she started in 91 events and collected $226,945 in official prize money.

Between 2000 and 2023, Pearce won five titles in pro-am events on the WPGA Tour of Australasia.

Pearce retired from full-time professional golf after the 2004 season, and later became a prominent player in Australian senior women's tennis.

Amateur wins
1984 Queensland Foursomes Championship (with Faye Payne)
1988 New South Wales Women's Amateur Championship

Professional wins (7)

Futures Tour wins (2)
1997 Loretto Futures Golf Classic
2000 Southwestern Bell Futures Classic

WPGA Tour of Australasia wins (5)
2000 Lexus Ladies Pro-am
2002 St Georges Basin Country Club Pro-Am
2005 Moss Vale Golf Club Pro-Am
2013 Anita Boon Pro-Am
2023 Moss Vale Women's Classic Pro-am

Results in LPGA majors
Results not in chronological order.

^ The Women's British Open replaced the du Maurier Classic as an LPGA major in 2001. 

CUT = missed the half-way cut
T = tied

References

External links

Karen Pearce at the WPGA Tour of Australasia official site

Australian female golfers
LPGA Tour golfers
Ladies European Tour golfers
ALPG Tour golfers
Sportspeople from Queensland
1968 births
Living people